The Hindsville Formation, or Hindsville Limestone Member of the Batesville Formation, is a geologic unit in northern Arkansas and eastern Oklahoma that dates to the Chesterian Series of the late Mississippian. Named for the town of Hindsville in Madison County, Arkansas, this unit is recognized as a member of the Batesville Formation in Arkansas and a geologic formation in Oklahoma. Although, some workers have proposed raising the rank of this interval in Arkansas to formation status. Both the Batesville and Hindsville Formations overlie the Moorefield Formation and underlie the Fayetteville Shale.

Paleofauna

Blastoids
Pentremites
"P. elongatusP. godoniP. pateiBryozoansArchimedesA. communisA. distansA. intermediusBatostomellaB. anomalaB. parvulaB. spinulosaCallocladiaC. elegansCoeloclemisC. tumidaDyscritellaD. insequalisD. robustaFenestellaF. cestriensisF. serratulaFistuliporaF. excelensF. excelens harrisonensisF. excelens williamsiIdioclemaI. insignePolyporaP. meslerianaPycnoporaP. bellaP. hirsutaP. regularisRhabdomesonR. tubumRhomboporaR. persimilis miserSeptoporaS. pinnataStenocladiaS. frondosaStreblotrypaS. nicklesiS. nicklesi robustaSulcoreteporaS. pustulosa arctaSyringoclemisS. biserialisTabuliporaT. cestriensisT. emaciata arkansanaT. emaciata inaequalisT. emaciata megastylaT. gracilisT. inermisT. intermittens harrisonensisT. longicamerataT. maculosaT. miseriT. miseri tubulataT. mutabilisT. perattenuataT. poculoformisT. ramosa fayettevillensisT. simulansCrinoids

 Abrotocrinus Agassizocrinus A. conicus Bronaughocrinus B. cherokeensus Cryphiocrinus C. bowsheri C. girtyi Dichocrinus D. girtyi Pentaramicrinus P. nitidus Staphylocrinus''

See also

 List of fossiliferous stratigraphic units in Arkansas
 Paleontology in Arkansas

References

 

Carboniferous Arkansas
Carboniferous southern paleotropical deposits